Ahmed Amine Galdoune (born 31 May 1996) is a Moroccan cyclist, who most recently rode for UCI Continental team .

Major results

2014
 1st  Time trial, National Junior Road Championships
2016
 African Track Championships
1st Keirin
3rd Points race
 1st Stage 2 Tour de Hongrie
2017
 1st GP Sakia El Hamra, Les Challenges de la Marche Verte
 Challenge du Prince
1st Trophée de la Maison Royale
2nd Trophée de l'Anniversaire
 3rd Road race, African Road Championships

References

External links

1996 births
Living people
Moroccan male cyclists
21st-century Moroccan people